Mohammad Hossein Sharifzadegan is an Iranian reformist politician. He served as the head of Social Security Organization for three years before taking office as a minister.

References

Living people
Year of birth missing (living people)
Government ministers of Iran
Islamic Iran Participation Front politicians